Latinath  is a village development committee in Darchula District in the Mahakali Zone of western Nepal. At the time of the 1991 Nepal census it had a population of 3392 people living in 587 individual households. In this development region one of the famous temple of this district is located which is called "latainath" or "latinath".

References

External links
UN map of the municipalities of Darchula District

Populated places in Darchula District